USS Thresher has been the name of more than one United States Navy ship, and may refer to:

 , a submarine in commission from 1940 to 1945 and in 1946
 , a submarine commissioned in 1961 and lost in 1963

See also
 

United States Navy ship names